Adam Eyre (born January 7, 1978) is a former American soccer player who played for New England Revolution in the MLS.

Career statistics

Club

Notes

References

1978 births
Living people
Santa Clara University alumni
American soccer players
Association football defenders
New England Revolution players
MLS Pro-40 players
Connecticut Wolves players
Minnesota Thunder players
Major League Soccer players
A-League (1995–2004) players
Santa Clara Broncos men's soccer players